The Senggchuppa is a mountain of the Swiss Pennine Alps, located south of the Simplon Pass in the canton of Valais. It lies north of the Fletschhorn-Lagginhorn-Weissmies group, the range lying between the Saastal and the Val Divedro.

The northern side of the mountain is covered by a glacier named Mattwaldgletscher.

References

External links
 Senggchuppa on Hikr

Mountains of the Alps
Alpine three-thousanders
Mountains of Switzerland
Mountains of Valais